Ramalina fastigiata is a species of fruticose lichen in the family Ramalinaceae. It is a common species found in Asia, Europe, and North America.

Taxonomy
The lichen was first formally described in 1794 by Christiaan Hendrik Persoon as Lichen fastigiatus. Erik Acharius transferred it to the genus Ramalina in his 1810 publication Lichenographia universalis.

Research
Ramalina fastigiata is sensitive to air pollution and has been used in several studies as a biomonitor of atmospheric pollution.

References

fastigiata
Lichen species
Lichens of Asia
Lichens of Europe
Lichens of North America
Lichens described in 1794
Taxa named by Christiaan Hendrik Persoon